Minera San Xavier is a subsidiary of the Canadian company New Gold Inc. that operates a gold and silver mine near Cerro de San Pedro, a municipality of San Luis Potosí just 12 kilometers away from the capital city of the state.  The city of San Luis Potosí was founded after gold was discovered in the hills near Cerro de San Pedro in the 15th century.

The company has defied legal resolutions against its operation by arranging economically with the Mexican ecological authority, the Secretariat of the Environment and Natural Resources (Secretaría de Medio Ambiente y Recursos Naturales, Semarnat), pushing them to disregard ecological research done by some independent institutions and to instead accept most other independent as well as company-funded and government required studies.  Continuous internal and external monitoring of mining activities has not produced any evidence of contamination to date.

On 5 February 2007, Pro San Luis Ecológico, A.C., filed a submission before the Commission for Environmental Cooperation under Article 14(1) of the North American Agreement on Environmental Cooperation. The submitter asserted that Mexico was failing to effectively enforce its environmental laws with respect to the authorization of the Cerro de San Pedro project in San San Luis Potos. In submission SEM-07-001 (Minera San Xavier), the submitter asserted that in April 2006 Semarnat violated a Mexican court ruling by authorizing Minera San Xavier project for a second time. On 15 July 2009, the CEC Secretariat decided not to recommend the development of a factual investigation.

See also
Cerro de San Pedro
San Luis Potosí

References

External links
Halifax Initiative's Letter to Ministers Mackay and Emerson on Metallica Resources
Court decision revokes Minera San Xavier's permits
Official website 
Technical paper by prestiguious university researchers, detailing the ecological impact 
website for the FAO, Frente amplo opositor; Broad Opposition Front against Minera San Xavier 
New Gold/Minera San Xavier Fact Sheet

Environmental disasters in Mexico
Gold mining companies of Mexico
Environment of Mexico
Silver mining companies of Mexico